The Suzuki GSX-R400 was a 400 class sport bike produced by Japanese motorcycle manufacturer Suzuki between 1984 and 1996. It was the first GSX-R model ever made by Suzuki, as a race replica evolution of sport touring GSX series. Like other bikes in its class, the GSX-R400 was continuously updated and subsequently there is a slew of different models.

All GSX-R400s were powered by naturally-aspirated, carburetted, 398cc four-stroke inline-four engines with four valves per cylinder and dual overhead camshafts. Whilst all engines were liquid-cooled, some models were also air and oil-cooled. Suzuki also changed the GSXRs frame type multiple times - with different twin-spar and double-cradle arrangements sampled throughout the production run - though they were always constructed solely of aluminium.

Models
The 1984 GSX-R400 was released in Japan and had .
 
In 1985 a fuel level gauge was added which showed the remaining amount of fuel indicated by the right side combination meter when the ignition was in the "Off" position.

The bike was almost entirely redesigned for 1986. The power-to-weight ratio was increased to 0.39 hp/kg with the new chassis and shorter wheelbase that Suzuki introduced. The 1986 and 1987 models use slightly different engines than before. The liquid cooling design was dropped for Suzuki's "SATCS" (Suzuki advanced three-way cooling system) that used water air and oil to keep the engine cool. A new single square headlight was also introduced which was never very popular and Suzuki returned the headlights to the two circular lights the following year.

Not many changes were made in 1987 with largest ones being the new wheels, twin headlights, gold brake calipers, the new paint scheme and the new exhaust design. A special edition was also available in 87' with a black/gold paint scheme.

In 1988 the GSX-R received a new aluminium frame which increased the weight and new fairings with a lower wheelbase once again to create a more stable and better handling bike. The model also got slingshot carburetors, polished stainless steel silencers, curved radiator, Tokico 4-cylinder front brake calipers and a rear hugger mudguard. The new 4 into 2 exhaust was designed to create more midrange torque but this had only a marginal effect on the engines power. Yoshimura also produced the cyclone system 4 into 1. In 1988 a sports production model was introduced (SP) which incorporate among other things no passenger foot pegs and the rear shocks were visible under the seat.

In 1989, the name of the model was additionally supplemented with the letter "R". The new GSX-R400R model name. In 1993 Powers was reduced to  because of a power restriction in Japan.
Production was ceased in May 1996.

Specifications

See also
Honda CBR400
Honda RVF400
Yamaha FZR400
Kawasaki ZXR400

References 

GSX-R400
Sport bikes
Motorcycles introduced in 1984